Debenjak is a Slovene surname. Notable people with the surname include:

Božidar Debenjak (born 1935), Slovenian Marxist philosopher, social theorist and translator
Doris Debenjak (1936–2013), Slovenian linguist and translator
Florijan Debenjak

Slovene-language surnames